Poillon-Seguine-Britton House was a historic home located in Great Kills, Staten Island, New York, near Great Kills Harbor.  The original section was built about 1695 for the French immigrant Jacques Poillon, with a 2-story addition completed about 1845 after the home was sold to Joseph Seguine, and a final major expansion in 1930 for Richard Britton. It was a substantial, -story, stone-and-wood structure in the local vernacular style.  The interior had some notable Greek Revival style details.

It was designated a New York City landmark in 1981 and added to the National Register of Historic Places in 1984, only to be burned in 1989 and demolished in 1996.

See also
List of New York City Designated Landmarks in Staten Island
National Register of Historic Places listings in Richmond County, New York

References

External links
 Joan H. Geismar (December 1996). "Documentary Study of 361 Great Kills Road (Poillon-Seguine-Britton House)", LPC 91-1594. "Prepared for submission to the Landmarks Commission as part of the de-designation process."

Houses completed in 1695
New York City Designated Landmarks in Staten Island
Buildings and structures demolished in 1996
Former New York City Designated Landmarks
Houses on the National Register of Historic Places in Staten Island
Greek Revival architecture in New York City
Greek Revival houses in New York (state)
1695 establishments in the Province of New York
1996 disestablishments in New York (state)
Great Kills, Staten Island